Princess Maria Aloisia Josephine Consolata Immaculata Benedicta Theresia Antonia Johanna Carla Conrada Leonharda of Löwenstein-Wertheim-Rosenberg (6 November 1935 – 20 July 2018) was a Princess of Löwenstein-Wertheim-Rosenberg and a member of the House of Löwenstein-Wertheim-Rosenberg by birth, and through her marriage to Archduke Joseph Árpád of Austria, an Archduchess of Austria.

Family
She was the eldest daughter and child of Karl, 8th Prince of Löwenstein-Wertheim-Rosenberg and his wife 
Donna  Carolina dei Conti Rignon. She was, on her mother's side, second cousin of Queen Paola of Belgium, née Ruffo di Calabria dei Principi Ruffo di Calabria.

Marriage and issue
She married Archduke Joseph Árpád of Austria, fourth eldest child and eldest son of Archduke Joseph Francis of Austria and his wife Princess Anna of Saxony, civilly on 25 August 1956 and religiously on 12 September 1956 in Bronnbach, Wertheim am Main, Baden-Württemberg, Germany. Maria and Joseph Árpád had eight children and twenty-nine grandchildren:

Archduke Joseph Karl of Austria (7 August 1957 – 8 August 1957)
Archduchess Monika-Ilona Maria Carolina Stephanie Elisabeth Immacolata Benedicta Dominica of Austria (14 September 1959) she married Charles-Henry de Rambures on 18 May 1996. They have one daughter:
Clara-Marie de Rambures (1 November 1998)
Archduke Joseph Karl Maria Árpád Stephan Pius Ignatius Aloysius Cyrillus of Austria (18 March 1961) he married Princess Margarite of Hohenberg on 28 December 1990. They have four children:
Archduchess Johanna of Austria (21 May 1992)
Archduke Joseph Albrecht of Austria (26 July 1994)
Archduke Paul Leo of Austria (13 January 1996)
Archduchess Elisabeth of Austria (22 September 1998) 
Archduchess Maria Christine Regina Stephania Immacolata Carolina Monika Ägidia of Austria (1 September 1963) she married Raymond van der Meide on 22 May 1988. They have seven children:
Miriam van der Meide (3 April 1989)
James Andrew van der Meide (6 March 1991)
Veronica van der Meide (24 August 1993)
John van der Meide (7 November 1996) 
Philip van der Meide (17 February 1998) 
Susanne van der Meide (26 October 2001) 
Elisabeth van der Meide (30 March 2003) 
Archduke Andreas-Augustinus Maria Árpád Aloys Konstantin Pius Ignatius Peter of Austria (29 April 1965) he married Countess Marie-Christine von Hatzfeldt-Dönhoff on 2 October 1994. They have six children:
Archduke Frédéric-Cyprien of Austria (18 July 1995) 
Archduke Pierre of Austria (8 May 1997) 
Archduchess Célina of Austria (14 November 1998) 
Archduchess Maria-Floriana of Austria (22 August 2001) 
Archduke Benedict-Alexander of Austria (26 September 2005)
Archduchess Alexandra Lydia Pia Immacolata Josepha Petra Paula Maria of Austria (29 June 1967) she married Wilhelmus de Wit on 19 June 1999. They have four children:
Laurents-Jan de Wit (9 March 2001) 
Clemens-Karl de Wit (2003) 
Johannes Paul de Wit (2005) 
Archduke Nicolaus Franziskus Alexander Nuno Josef Árpád Ruppert Donatus Virgil Maria of Austria (27 November 1973) he married Eugenia de Calonje y Gurrea in July 2002. They have four children:
Archduke Nicolás of Austria (2 May 2003) 
Archduchess Sofía of Austria (2 January 2006) 
Archduke Santiago of Austria (12 October 2008) 
Archduchess María Carlota of Austria (2010) 
Archduke Johannes Jacobus Josef Árpád Ulrich Pius Stephan Ignatius Hermann Maria of Austria (21 May 1975) he married María Gabriela Montenegro Villamizar  on 3 October 2009. They have three sons:
Archduke Johannes of Austria (13 September 2010) 
Archduke Alejandro of Austria (30 December 2012) 
Archduke Ignacio José of Austria (8 May 2014)

Death
She died on 20 July 2018 at her home in Vienna at the age of 82.

Ancestry

References

1935 births
2018 deaths
Austrian princesses
Princesses of Löwenstein-Wertheim-Rosenberg
Nobility from Munich